The Democratic National Alliance was a political alliance in Sri Lanka, formed by retired General Sarath Fonseka and his allies to contest in the 2010 general elections. The alliance is mainly made up of allies of Fonseka and of the following parties

Janatha Vimukthi Peramuna (JVP)
Democratic National Front
Democratic United National Front
People's Tamil Congress
Voice of Muslim Organization

Ruhunu Janatha Party left the alliance and joined the UPFA March 2010. Nava Sihala Urumaya was a member of the DNA until it was sacked from the alliance in November 2010. The DNA's application for registration as a separate party was rejected by the authorities in January 2011.

2010 general election
The Democratic National Alliance had a poor showing at the 2010 general election, obtaining a little over 5% of the national vote and winning just 7 seats in the 225 member parliament. This is a significant decline from the 40% national vote Fonseka obtained in the 2010 presidential election when he was endorsed by many notable opposition parties which did not join the DNA at the general election, including the main opposition United National Party and the Tamil National Alliance and decrease from the 39 members the Janatha Vimukthi Peramuna JVP alone had in parliament. Apart from Fonseka, the members elected were former Sri Lanka national cricket team captain and former SLFP member MP Arjuna Ranatunga, businessman Tiran Alles and four members of the JVP. Fonseka was later jailed by court martial and vacated his seat on 7 October 2010. After a legal battle to maintain his MP status he was replaced by DNA member Jayantha Ketagoda on 8 March 2011.

Electoral history

References

2009 establishments in Sri Lanka
Defunct political party alliances in Sri Lanka
Political parties established in 2009
Political parties in Sri Lanka